Bjugstad is a surname. Notable people with the surname include:

Nick Bjugstad (born 1992), American ice hockey player
Scott Bjugstad (born 1961), American ice hockey player